Novousmansky District is an administrative and municipal district (raion), one of the thirty-two in Voronezh Oblast, Russia. It is located in the north of the oblast. Its administrative center is the rural locality (a selo) of Novaya Usman. Population: 7 The population of Novaya Usman accounts for 42.0% of the district's total population.

References

Notes

Sources

Districts of Voronezh Oblast